Eric Humberto Avila (born November 24, 1987) is an American professional soccer player who has played as a midfielder and defender.

Early life and education
Avila who is of Mexican descent, was born on November 24, 1987, in San Diego, California, to Julio and Maria Avila. Avila was raised in the Carlsbad and Encinitas area and started playing soccer with an American Youth Soccer Organization team. He later played club soccer for the San Diego Crusaders and La Jolla Nomads. With the Nomads, he helped the team to the 2002 US Club Soccer national championship.

He attended La Costa Canyon High School for two years and played for their boys soccer program.  He was named the CIF San Diego Section's Avocado League MVP as a sophomore for the Mavericks. He finished his last two years of high school with the United States U-17 Residency Program in Bradenton, Florida. Upon his return to California, Avila was briefly a member of Chivas USA's U-19 club.

Prior to enrolling in college, Avila was ranked as the 2nd best midfielder and 6th best prospect overall in the class of 2005 by StudentSportsSoccer.com. Avila was recruited with a scholarship to attend the University of California, Santa Barbara by head coach Tim Vom Steeg. Avila was the marquee signing in a class that contained future professionals Chris Pontius, Alfonso Motagalvan, and Ryan Kenny.

As a freshman on the UC Santa Barbara Gauchos men's soccer team in 2005, he started 21 games while scoring three goals and assisting on five more. Avila was named to the College Soccer News All-Freshman First Team as well as being the Big West Conference Freshman of the Year. As a sophomore, Avila started 25 games, scoring eight goals to go along with five assists. He scored the national championship-winning goal in the 2006 NCAA Division I Men's Soccer Championship final over the UCLA Bruins. He was named to the All-College Cup team. As a junior, Avila appeared in 20 games, starting 18 of them. He scored four more goals and added eight assists. He left UCSB to pursue a professional career at the conclusion of the season and finished his Gaucho career with 66 games played, 15 goals, and 18 assists.

During his college years, Avila also played in the USL Premier Development League for the San Fernando Valley Quakes and Ventura County Fusion.

Club career

FC Dallas
Avila decided to forgo his senior season as professional clubs started to show interest. Avila decided to sign a Generation Adidas contract and he was subsequently drafted in the 2nd Round (19th Overall) by FC Dallas in the 2008 MLS SuperDraft.

Avila made his MLS debut for FC Dallas as an 85th-minute substitute against the Houston Dynamo in a 1–1 tie on June 26, 2008.  He earned his first MLS career assist on a header by Abe Thompson during stoppage time helping FC Dallas to a 1–1 tie against the Kansas City Wizards on July 4, 2008. and scored his first senior goal on June 20, 2009, in a game against Columbus Crew.

During the 2010 MLS Cup Playoffs, he scored the winning goal in the 88th minute to give Dallas a win over Real Salt Lake in the first leg of the Western Conference semifinals, helping the Red Stripes win the series, 3–2, on aggregate as Dallas made its first-ever MLS Cup appearance.

In December 2008, Avila traveled to England with fellow FC Dallas teammates Bruno Guarda, Josh Lambo, and Anthony Wallace along with other Generation Adidas players for friendlies against the reserve squads of Chelsea, Reading, and Aston Villa. He graduated from the MLS Generation Adidas program at the end of the 2010 season. In July 2011 it was announced that Avila had been transferred on a loan to F.C. Atlas for 6 months, but the loan deal fell through.

Toronto FC
On August 2, 2011, FC Dallas traded Avila to Toronto FC for Maicon Santos and an international roster spot (through the remainder of the 2011 season). Four days later Avila made his debut for the team against D.C. United in a 3–3 away draw. Avila scored his first goal for Toronto on August 27 in a 1–1 home draw against San Jose Earthquakes. Avila scored his first goal of the 2012 season against Real Salt Lake April 28 in a 3–2 away defeat.

Chivas USA
When Avila's contract expired at the end of the 2012 season he elected to participate in the 2012 MLS Re-Entry Draft. On December 14, 2012, Avila was selected by Colorado Rapids in stage two of the draft. About a month later, Avila was traded to Chivas USA for Nick LaBrocca. Avila went on trial with C.D. Guadalajara of the Liga MX on two occasions but the club never signed him. There was also speculation that Santos Laguna were going to sign him but the negotiations seemed to stop.

Orlando City
Avila joined Orlando on a loan from Santos Laguna. He scored his first goal May 17, 2015 against LA Galaxy in which Orlando City SC won 4–0. Avila made 21 appearances for Orlando in 2015, totaling 1,325 minutes of play.

Tampa Bay Rowdies
On February 26, 2016, Avila joined the Tampa Bay Rowdies on a one-year contract with a club option for 2017.

Phoenix Rising
Avila signed with Phoenix Rising FC on April 28, 2017.

ASC San Diego
For the 2018 season he was on the roster at NPSL team ASC San Diego.

Coaching 
Following his retirement from playing, Avila coached the San Diego Nomads U-15 team in MLS Next in 2021 and early 2022. On March 3, 2022, Avila returned to Birmingham Legion to serve as the Legion's Academy director and first team assistant coach.

International career
Avila entered the US U17 Residency Program in Bradenton, Florida in the fall of 2003. He made his first appearance with US U-17's at the age of 15 against England. He went on to earn 9 international caps with the U-17's, appearing in 15 total matches. The total was the highest of the 1987 boys class. His last appearance came in Spring of 2005.

He helped lead the U.S. to the finals of the Ballymena International Tournament held in Northern Ireland, which he regards as one of his most memorable moments in sports. He also participated in the Mondial Minimes Montaigu Vendee Tournament held in France. In addition to tournaments, he played in a number of matches against Major League Soccer teams, including Los Angeles Galaxy, Chicago Fire, and Columbus Crew, while scoring the game-tying goal in a friendly against the San Jose Earthquakes.

Career statistics

Honors
UC Santa Barbara
NCAA Men's Division I Soccer Championship: 2006

FC Dallas
Major League Soccer Western Conference Championship: 2010

Toronto FC
Canadian Championship: 2012

References

External links

 
 UC Santa Barbara player profile
 

1987 births
Living people
Soccer players from San Diego
American soccer players
American expatriate soccer players
Association football midfielders
UC Santa Barbara Gauchos men's soccer players
San Fernando Valley Quakes players
Ventura County Fusion players
FC Dallas players
Toronto FC players
Chivas USA players
Santos Laguna footballers
Orlando City SC players
Tampa Bay Rowdies players
Phoenix Rising FC players
USL League Two players
Major League Soccer players
North American Soccer League players
USL Championship players
Expatriate soccer players in Canada
Sportspeople from Carlsbad, California
United States men's youth international soccer players
United States men's under-20 international soccer players
American sportspeople of Mexican descent
FC Dallas draft picks
Las Vegas Lights FC players
Birmingham Legion FC players
San Diego Loyal SC players
USL Championship coaches